Masoud Rahimiha was an Iranian boxer. He competed in the men's lightweight event at the 1948 Summer Olympics. At the 1948 Summer Olympics, he lost to Wallace Smith of the United States.

References

External links
 

Year of birth missing
Possibly living people
Iranian male boxers
Olympic boxers of Iran
Boxers at the 1948 Summer Olympics
Place of birth missing
Lightweight boxers
20th-century Iranian people